Callum is a Scottish Gaelic name that commemorates the Latin name Columba, meaning 'dove'. Callum was popular among early Christians because the dove was a symbol of purity, peace and the Holy Spirit. St. Columba was one of the most influential of the early Celtic saints. The name may also be spelled "Calum". Callum is a popular name, especially in Scotland where it was the 34th most popular name for baby boys in 2017.

People with the given name
Callum Ah Chee (born 1997), Australian rules footballer
Callum Ainley (born 1997), English footballer
Callum Ball (born 1992), English footballer
Callum Barker (born 1997), Australian motorcycle racer
Callum Black (born 1986), American-born Irish rugby union player
Callum Blake (born 1994), Vanuatuan cricketer
Callum Blue (born 1977), English actor
Callum Braley (born 1994), English rugby union player
Callum Brittain, English footballer
Callum Brodrick (born 1998), English cricketer
Callum Brown (born 1998), Australian rules footballer
Callum Bruce (born 1983), New Zealand rugby union player
Callum Burton (born 1996), English footballer
Callum Camps, English-born Northern Ireland footballer
Callum Casey (born 1990), Irish rugby league player
Callum Chambers (born 1979), Australian rules footballer
Callum Chettle (born 1996), English footballer
Callum Cockerill-Mollett (born 1999), English-born Irish footballer
Callum Connolly (born 1997), English footballer
Callum Cooke (born 1997), English footballer
Callum Crane (born 1996), Scottish footballer
Callum Crawford (born 1984), Canadian lacrosse player
Callum Cuthbertson, Scottish actor and writer
Callum Davidson (born 1976), Scottish footballer
Callum Davies (born 1993), English footballer
Callum Dixon, English actor
Callum Driver (born 1992), English footballer
Callum Elder (born 1995), Australian soccer player
Callum Evans (born 1995), English footballer
Callum Ferguson (born 1984), Australian cricketer
Callum Field (born 1997), English rugby league player
Callum Fordyce (born 1992), Scottish footballer
Callum Geldart (born 1991), English cricketer
Callum Gibbins (born 1988), New Zealand rugby union player
Callum Guest (born 1995), English cricketer
Callum Guy (born 1996), English footballer
Callum Harriott (born 1994), English footballer
Callum Hart (born 1985), Welsh footballer
Callum Hassan (born 1993), English footballer
Callum Hawkins (born 1992), British long-distance runner
Callum Hemming (born 1999), English badminton player
Callum Hendry (born 1997), English footballer
Calum Hood (born 1996), Bassist in '5 Seconds of Summer'
Callum Hunter-Hill (born 1997), Scottish rugby union player
Callum Ilott (born 1998), British racing driver
Callum Innes (born 1962), Scottish painter
Callum Irving (born 1993), Canadian soccer player
Callum Jackson (born 1994), English cricketer
Callum Johnson (born 1985), English boxer
Callum Johnson (footballer) (born 1996), English footballer
Callum Kennedy (born 1989), English footballer
Callum Lancaster (born 1996), English rugby league player
Callum Lang (born 1998), English footballer
Callum Lloyd (born 1986), English footballer
Callum MacDonald (born 1983), Scottish footballer
Callum Macdonald (1912–1999), Scottish printer and publisher
Callum MacLeod (born 1988), British racing driver
Callum Macrae, Scottish filmmaker, writer and journalist
Callum Maycock (born 1997), English footballer
Callum McCaig (born 1995), Scottish politician
Callum McCarthy (born 1944), British banker
Callum McFadzean (born 1994), Scottish footballer
Callum McGregor (born 1993), Scottish footballer
Callum McManaman (born 1991), English footballer
Callum McNaughton (born 1991), English footballer
Callum McNish (born 1992), English footballer
Callum Mills (born 1997), Australian rules footballer
Callum Milne (born 1965), Scottish footballer
Callum Moore (born 1996), Australian rules footballer
Callum Morris (born 1990), English footballer
Callum O'Dowda (born 1995), Republic of Ireland footballer
Callum O'Hare (born 1998), English footballer
Callum Parkinson (born 1996), English cricketer
Callum Paterson (born 1994), Scottish footballer
Callum Phillips (born 1992), English rugby league player
Callum Priestley (born 1989), English hurdler
Callum Preston (born 1995), English footballer
Callum Reid (born 1992), Scottish rugby union player
Callum Reidford (born 1987), Scottish footballer
Callum Reilly (footballer) (born 1993), English footballer
Callum Keith Rennie (born 1960), British-born Canadian actor
Callum Roberts, British oceanographer
Callum Robertson (born 1996), Scottish footballer
Callum Robinson (born 1995), English footballer
Callum Ross (born 1994), English footballer
Callum Rzonca (born 1997), English footballer
Callum Saunders (born 1995), Welsh footballer
Callum Scotson (born 1996), Australian cyclist
Callum Shinkwin (born 1993), English golfer
Callum Sinclair (born 1989), Australian Rules footballer
Callum Skinner (born 1992), British cyclist
Callum Smith (disambiguation), multiple people
Callum Styles (born 2000), English footballer
Callum Tapping (born 1993), Scottish footballer
Callum Taylor (born 1997), English cricketer
Callum Templeton (born 1993), Scottish rugby union player
Callum Thorp (born 1975), Australian cricketer
Callum Timmins (born 1999), Australian soccer player
Callum Turner (born 1990), English actor and model
Callum Urch (born 1984), Australian rules footballer
Callum Morris (Born 1986), Footballer
Callum Warburton (born 1989), English footballer
Callum Watson (born 1989), Australian cross-country skier
Callum Wilkinson (born 1997), English racewalker
Callum Wilson (disambiguation), multiple people
Callum Windley (born 1991), English rugby league player

People with the surname
 Agnes Kane Callum (1925-2015), American genealogist
Arthur Callum, New Zealand rugby league player
Ian Callum (born 1955), British car designer
Jeannie Callum, Canadian transfusion specialist
Moray Callum (born 1958), British car designer

Other uses 
 Callum Is a Snake, song by english band Bloc Party

Fictional characters
Callum Clockwise, in the video game Rascal
Callum Jones, in the television series Neighbours
Callum Kane, in the television series Hollyoaks
Callum Logan, in the television series Coronation Street
Callum Lynch, in the film Assassin's Creed
Callum Mcgregor, from the Noughts & Crosses novels
PC Callum McIntyre, in the television series Monarch of the Glen
Callum McKay, in the television series Shortland Street
Callum Highway, in the television series EastEnders
Callum Hunt, from The Magisterium Series novels
Callum Monks, in the television series EastEnders
Callum Rennie, in the television series Emmerdale
Callum Stone, in the television series The Bill
 Prince Callum, in the television series The Dragon Prince
 Dick and Dorothea Callum, in Arthur Ransome's Swallows and Amazons books

See also
Callumn Morrison (born 1999), Scottish footballer
Calum
Colum (disambiguation)
Colm
Colon (disambiguation)

Scottish masculine given names
Scottish surnames
Scottish Gaelic-language surnames
English masculine given names